The offshore lizardfish (Synodus poeyi) is a species of lizardfish that occurs chiefly in the western Atlantic.

The offshore lizardfish is a marine species associated with reefs. This species is native to a subtropical environment. Its distribution in the Western Atlantic extends from North Carolina in the United States through the northern Gulf of Mexico and the Antilles to the Guianas. It occurs outside the shore zone. It is benthic, living along sandy and muddy bottoms.

Common names
Common names for Synodus poeyi in other languages include calango, lagarto do mar, peixe-lagarto (Portuguese), chile barbado, guaripete, guavina, lagarto barbado, lagarto oceánico, manuelito (Spanish), and otogai-aka-eso (Japanese).

Notes

References
 

offshore lizardfish
Fauna of the Southeastern United States
Fish of the Caribbean
offshore lizardfish
Taxa named by David Starr Jordan